Afrânio Antônio da Costa (14 March 1892 – 26 June 1979) was a Brazilian sport shooter who competed in the 1920 Summer Olympics. He served as a judge of the Brazilian  (TFR) between 1947 and 1962. He was born and died in Rio de Janeiro.

In 1920 he won the silver medal in the 50 metre free pistol event and the bronze medal with the Brazilian team in the team 50 metre free pistol competition. He was also part of the Brazilian team which finished fourth in the  Shooting at the 1920 Summer Olympics - Men's 30 metre team military pistol|team 30 metre military pistol event.

References

1892 births
1979 deaths
Brazilian male sport shooters
ISSF pistol shooters
Olympic shooters of Brazil
Shooters at the 1920 Summer Olympics
Olympic silver medalists for Brazil
Olympic bronze medalists for Brazil
Olympic medalists in shooting
Medalists at the 1920 Summer Olympics
20th-century Brazilian judges
Sportspeople from Rio de Janeiro (city)
19th-century Brazilian people
20th-century Brazilian people